The 2005 U-18 Junior World Cup was an ice hockey tournament held in Břeclav, Czech Republic and Piešťany, Slovakia between August 9, 2005 and August 14, 2005. The venues used for the tournament were Zimní Stadion in Břeclav and Zimny Stadion in Piešťany. Canada defeated the Czech Republic 5-3 in the final to claim the gold medal, while Finland defeated Russia to capture the bronze medal.

Challenge results

Preliminary round

Group A

Group B

Final round

Final standings

External links
Tournament information from Hockey Canada

U-18 Junior World Cup, 2005
2005
International ice hockey competitions hosted by Slovakia
International ice hockey competitions hosted by the Czech Republic
Ivan
2005–06 in Slovak ice hockey